The Warka Vase or Uruk vase is a slim carved alabaster vessel found in the temple complex of the Sumerian goddess Inanna in the ruins of the ancient city of Uruk, located in the modern Al Muthanna Governorate, in southern Iraq. Like the Uruk Trough and the Narmer Palette from Egypt, it is one of the earliest surviving works of narrative relief sculpture, dated to c. 3200–3000 BC. Simple relief sculpture is also known from much earlier periods, from the site of Göbekli Tepe, dating to circa 9000 BC.

The bottom register displays naturalistic components of life, including water and plants, such as date palm, barley, and wheat. On the upper portion of the lowest register, alternating rams and ewes march in a single file. The middle register conveys naked men carrying baskets of foodstuffs symbolizing offerings. Lastly, the top register depicts the goddess Inanna accepting a votive offer. Inanna stands at the front portion of the gate surrounded by her richly filled shrine and storehouse (identifiable by two reed door poles with dangling banners). This scene may illustrate a reproduction of the ritual marriage between the goddess and Dumuzi, her consort that ensures Uruk's continued vitality. The vase depicts an example of hierarchy being a portion of nature, and, according to anthropologist Susan Pollock, shows that social and natural hierarchies were most likely akin to each other in ancient Mesopotamia.

Discovery
The vase was discovered as a collection of fragments by German Assyriologists in their sixth excavation season at Uruk in 1933/1934. The find was recorded as find number W14873 in the expedition's field book under an entry dated 2 January 1934, which read "Großes Gefäß aus Alabaster, ca. 96 cm hoch mit Flachrelief" ("large container of alabaster, circa 96 cm high with flat-reliefs"). It is named after the modern village of Warka – known as Uruk to the ancient Sumerians. A plaster cast was made of the original and this reproduction stood for many decades in room 5 of the Near-Eastern Museum in Berlin (Vorderasiatisches Museum Berlin), Germany.

Decoration
The vase has three registers – or tiers – of carving. The bottom register depicts the vegetation in the Tigris and Euphrates delta, such as the natural reeds and cultivated grain. Above this vegetation is a procession of animals, such as ram and sheep presented in a strict profile view. The procession continues in the second register with nude males carrying bowls and jars of sacrificial elements, such as fruit and grain. The top register is a full scene, rather than a continuous pattern. In this register, the procession ends at the temple area. Inanna, one of the chief goddesses of Mesopotamia and later known as Ishtar in the Akkadian pantheon, stands, signified by two bundles of reeds behind her. She is being offered a bowl of fruit and grain by a nude figure. The en of Uruk dressed in a ceremonial kilt and long belt faces her leading the procession.

Components

Theft and restoration

The Warka Vase was one of the thousands of artifacts which were looted from the National Museum of Iraq during the 2003 Invasion of Iraq. In April 2003 it was forcibly wrenched from the case where it was mounted, snapping at the base (the foot of the vase remaining attached to the base of the smashed display case.

The vase was later returned during an amnesty to the Iraq Museum on 12 June 2003 by three unidentified men in their early twenties, driving a red Toyota vehicle. As reported by a correspondent for The Times newspaper,

Soon after the vase's return, broken into 14 pieces, it was announced that the vase would be restored. A pair of comparison photographs, released by the Oriental Institute, Chicago, showed significant damage (as of the day of return, 12 June 2003) to the top and bottom of the vessel.

The fully restored Warka Vase (museum number IM19606) is now on display in the Iraq Museum.

See also

Archaeological looting in Iraq
Art of Mesopotamia
Mask of Warka
Blau Monuments
Stele of Ushumgal

References

External links
Lost Treasures from Iraq—Objects (Oriental Institute of the University of Chicago) (pre-2003 b&w photo compared with colour photograph from 12 June 2003)
The Warka Vase (ancientworlds.net)
Fiona Curruthers, "Iraq Museum resembled 'emergency ward'", University of Sydney News, 19 September 2003. (Colour image of pre-war Warka Vase, as well as missing "Lady of Uruk (Warka)" stone head).
The Iraq Museum Database (hosted by the Oriental Institute, Chicago)

Objects in the National Museum of Iraq
Sumerian art and architecture
Sculpture of the Ancient Near East
Archaeological theft
Alabaster
Stolen works of art
4th-millennium BC works
Individual vases
Uruk
Inanna